Mohammad Khorshed Anwar (known as M. K. Anwar; 1 January 1933 – 24 October 2017) was a Bangladesh Nationalist Party politician and a government minister of Bangladesh. He was a five-term Jatiya Sangsad member representing the Comilla-1 and Comilla-2 constituencies.

Career
Anwar joined in the government service in 1953 as an officer of Civil Service of Pakistan (CSP). Until his retirement from government positions, he had served as the finance secretary and cabinet secretary. He joined Bangladesh Nationalist Party in 1991.

Anwar was first elected as a Jatiya Sangsad member for Comilla-1 at the 1991 general election. He was re-elected at the 1996 and 2001 general elections. He was a standing committee member of Bangladesh Nationalist Party. He served as the Minister of Agriculture under Second Khaleda Cabinet during 2001–2006. He was a vice-president of the party.

Lawsuits
In 2014, Anwar was sued by Bangladesh Police for causing communal disharmony after he accused Bangladesh Awami League of burning Quran during Hifazat-e Islam protests, while proclaiming Hifazats innocence. In 2015, Bangladesh police filed a case against him over violence during the 10th national elections. In March 2017, arrest warrants were issued against him.

Death
Anwar died on 24 October 2017.

References

1933 births
2017 deaths
People from Comilla District
Bangladesh Nationalist Party politicians
Agriculture ministers of Bangladesh
5th Jatiya Sangsad members
6th Jatiya Sangsad members
7th Jatiya Sangsad members
8th Jatiya Sangsad members
9th Jatiya Sangsad members